Hiawatha Township is a township in Brown County, Kansas, USA.  As of the 2000 census, its population was 739.

Hiawatha Township was formed in 1872.

Geography
According to the USGS, it contains one cemetery, Mount Hope.

The stream of North Fork Wolf River runs through this township.

Transportation
Hiawatha Township contains two airports or landing strips: Davis Airfield and Hiawatha Municipal Airport.

References

 USGS Geographic Names Information System (GNIS)

External links
 US-Counties.com
 City-Data.com

Townships in Brown County, Kansas
Townships in Kansas
1872 establishments in Kansas
Populated places established in 1872